Quercus rugosa, commonly known as the netleaf oak, is a broad-leaved tree in the beech and oak family Fagaceae. It is native to southern North America.

Description
Quercus rugosa is an evergreen shrub or tree. The bark is brown and scaly. The leaves are thick and leathery, rarely flat, usually cupped, up to 15 centimetres (6 inches) long, dark green on the top but covered with a thick of reddish-brown hairs on the underside. The young leaves are also very hairy and usually red or yellow.

Name 
Quercus rugosa is Latin for "wrinkled oak". In Spanish it has many common names, like "encino negro" (black oak) or "encino quiebra hacha" (axe-breaking oak). Colloquially it is known as "chaparro," a word which has also passed into the lexicon as slang for a short person.

Distribution 
It is widespread in Mexico, Guatemala and the southwestern United States (Arizona, New Mexico, western Texas). It grows extensively in the temperate highlands of central Mexico, particularly on hillsides and in narrow gorges, between 1,800 and 2,900 meters elevation. It is associated and usually coexists with other oaks, alders, pines and Texas madrones.

See also
 Madrean pine-oak woodlands
 Trans-Mexican Volcanic Belt pine-oak forests

References

External links

Photo of herbarium specimen at Missouri Botanical Garden, collected in Durango in 1904

rugosa
Flora of the Sierra Madre Occidental
Flora of the Sierra Madre Oriental
Flora of the Trans-Mexican Volcanic Belt
Flora of the Sierra Madre de Oaxaca
Flora of the Chiapas Highlands
Oaks of Mexico
Plants described in 1801
Trees of the Southwestern United States
Trees of Chiapas
Trees of Guerrero
Trees of Michoacán
Trees of Oaxaca
Trees of Puebla
Trees of Veracruz
Flora without expected TNC conservation status